Tikhy is a rural locality (a settlement) in Stepanovskoye Rural Settlement, Kudymkarsky District, Perm Krai, Russia. The population was 335 as of 2010. There are 7 streets.

Geography 
Tikhy is located 4 km west of Kudymkar (the district's administrative centre) by road. Kudymkar is the nearest rural locality.

References 

Rural localities in Kudymkarsky District